Morral may refer to:

 Mateu Morral, Catalan anarchist who tried to assassinate Alfonso XIII of Spain
 Morral, Ohio
 A feedbag made of thick cloth